ঘুমন্ত শহরে (In the Sleeping City) is the fifth studio album Bangladeshi rock band LRB. It was released on 13 July 1995, by Soundtek Electronics Limited. It was their first album to feature drummer Riyad, following the departure of previous drummer Milton Akbar.

Track listing

Personnel 
LRB
 Ayub Bachchu - lead singer, lead guitar
 S.I. Tutul - keyboards, backing vocals, rhythm guitars
 Saidul Hasan Swapan - bass guitars
 Riyadh Sarwar - drums

Production
 Azam Babu - Sound Engineering and Mixing
 Mainul Islam - Sleeve design

Lyrics
 Angel Shofik - Track 1,3,8 and 10
 Jayed Amin - Tracks 2 and 9
 Bappi Khan - Tracks 4,6 and 11
 Ayub Bachchu - Track 5
 Latiful Islam Shibly - Track 6
 Tanvir Murshed Khan - Track 12

References 

1995 albums
Love Runs Blind albums